Urban rail transit in China encompasses a broad range of urban and suburban electric passenger rail mass transit systems including subway, light rail, tram and maglev. Some classifications also include non-rail bus rapid transport.

All of the world's 500 km-plus, as well as 17 of the world's 27 200 km-plus metro systems and half of the top 10 busiest metro systems are in China (Shanghai, Guangzhou, Beijing, Chengdu, and Shenzhen), where Shanghai Metro, though started operating in 1993, is now the longest.

History

Several Chinese cities had urban electric tramways in the early 20th century, most of which were dismantled in the 1950s–1970s. The only surviving tramways are in Dalian (Dairen) and Changchun (see trams in Dalian and trams in Changchun). Nanjing (Nanking) had  from 1907 to 1958. 

The first subway in China was built in Beijing in 1969 (but it was only handed to civilian control in 1981 and trial operations ended later in the same year; before which credentials were required). The Tianjin Metro followed in 1984. The MTR Corporation Limited from across the border in Hong Kong has investment, consulting and management stakes in the rapid transit systems of several mainland Chinese cities (having completed their first section of subway and entered into revenue operation in 1979 in New Kowloon, at the time when the territory was under British rule).

The rapid growth of the Chinese economy since the 1980s has created a huge surge in demand for urban transport. This prompted cities across China to pursue and draft proposals for subway networks, with Shanghai and Guangzhou opening their first sections of subway in the 1990s, inspiring more cities to propose subway networks. In 1995, the Central Government, alarmed by the high cost and financial debt from these ambitious subway plans, put out a "notice on the suspension of approval of urban underground rapid rail transit projects" barring new subway systems outside of Beijing, Tianjin, Guangzhou and Shanghai from being built. At the time Nanjing, Wuhan, Chongqing, Dalian and Shenzhen had advanced proposals waiting to be approved. Wuhan, Chongqing, Dalian managed to circumvent the moratorium on subway construction by constructing and opening lower cost elevated lines, light metros, and monorails in the early 2000s. Rapid urbanization of China led to severe congestion and pollution in urban areas leading to the suspension being lifted. Initially, light metro lines using small profile and shorter rolling stock were constructed to reduce costs. It was assumed that as ridership grows the line will operate trains at a low headway to increase capacity. This design paradigm was known in China as "small groups, high density" operation. However, after a few years operating, many of these lines such as Guangzhou Metro Line 3, Line 6, Shanghai Metro Line 6, and Line 8 were severely overcapacity. Guangzhou Metro Line 3 was able to reconfigure from 3-car trains into 6-car trains to slightly relieve overcapacity. This led many cities such as Beijing, Guangzhou, Wuhan and Chengdu to use higher capacity designs on newer lines.

Since the mid-2000s, the growth of rapid transit systems in Chinese cities has rapidly accelerated, with most of the world's new subway mileage in the past decade opening in China. From 2009 to 2015, China built 87 mass transit rail lines, totaling , in 25 cities at the cost of ¥988.6 billion. In 2016, the Chinese government lowered the minimum population criteria for a city to start planning a metro system from 3 million to 1.5 million residents. As part of its 13th Five Year Plan, the Chinese government published a transport whitepaper titled "Development of China's Transport". The plan envisions a more sustainable transport system with priority focused on high-capacity public transit particularly urban rail transit and bus rapid transit. All cities with over 3 million residents will start or continue to develop urban rail networks. Regional rail networks will be constructed internally connect and integrate urban agglomerations such as the Jingjinji, Yangtze River Delta and Pearl River Delta areas. In 2017, some 43 smaller third-tier cities in China have received approval to develop subway lines.

Urban rapid transit systems

Statistics

Urban rapid transit systems

Urban rapid transit lines

Legend
 – Lines in operation – Lines under testing

Commencement dates of lines and extensions

Legend
 – Lines / extensions in operation.
 – Lines / extensions under testing.

Currently operational

Anhui

Beijing-Tianjin-Hebei

Chongqing-Sichuan

Fujian

Gansu

Guangdong-Hong Kong-Macau

Guangxi

Guizhou

Heilongjiang

Henan

Hubei

Hunan

Inner Mongolia

Jiangxi

Jilin

Liaoning

Shaanxi

Shandong

Shanghai-Jiangsu-Zhejiang

Shanxi

Xinjiang

Yunnan

Under construction
Metro
(Currently no new systems)
Maglev
Qingyuan Maglev

Monorail

Bengbu Rail Transit
Guilin Rail Transit
Liuzhou Rail Transit
Shantou Metro

Construction suspended
 Baotou Metro
 Hengyang Metro

Proposed
 Anqing Metro
 
 Chengde Metro
 Chenzhou Metro
 Chifeng Metro
 
 Datong Metro
 
 
 Fuxin Metro
 Fuyang Metro
 
 Guangyuan Metro
 
 
 
 
 
 Huzhou Metro
 
 
  (excluding Line 11 of Shanghai Metro and under construction Line S1 of Suzhou Metro which both run into Kunshan)
 Liaocheng Metro
 
 
 Longyan Metro
 Luzhou Metro
 Ma'anshan Metro
 
 Nanchong Metro
 Nanyang Metro
 Neijiang Metro
 
 
 Quzhou Metro
 Rizhao Metro
 Sanya Metro
 Shangrao Metro
 Shiyan Metro
 Suqian Metro
 Tangshan Metro
 
 
 
 Weinan Metro
 Wuzhou Metro
 Xiangyang Metro
 Xingtai Metro
 Xining Metro
 Xuancheng Metro
 Yancheng Metro
 
 
 Yichang Metro
 Yinchuan Metro
 Yulin Metro
 Zhangjiagang Metro
 Zhangzhou Metro
 Zhanjiang Metro
 
 Zhongshan Metro
 Zhuzhou Metro
 Zibo Metro
 

Notes

Regional, suburban, & commuter rail

Tram and light rail systems

Legend
 - In operation.
 - Under test run.
 - Out of service

Under construction
Baoshan Tram
Dujiangyan Tram
Delingha Modern Tram
Guiyang Tram
Lijiang Tram
Turpan Tram
Xi'an High-tech Zone Tram
Zhangye Danxia Tram

Monorail/maglev systems

Under Counstruction
Enshi Prefecture Tourism Rail Transit
Guang'an Metro
Guilin Rail Transit
Jining Rail Transit
Anyang Rail Transit
Qingyuan Maglev
Shantou Metro
Liuzhou Rail Transit
Bengbu Rail Transit

See also

Rapid transit in Taiwan
Trams in China
Autonomous Rail Rapid Transit in China
List of tram and light rail transit systems
List of town tramway systems in Asia
List of rapid transit systems
List of trolleybus systems

Notes

References

External links
China Urban Mass Transit Network
Urban Mass Transit Industry Net
Urban Mass Transportation Research
chinametro.org
China Bus Rapid Transit Network
2016 China Urban Rail Transit Network